Guo Yuehua  (Kuo Yao-Hua) is a former Chinese table tennis player.

Table tennis career
From 1976 to 1983, Yuehua won several medals in singles, doubles, and team events in the Asian Table Tennis Championships, Table Tennis World Cup, and World Table Tennis Championships.

The eleven World Championship medals included six gold medals; two in the men's singles at the 1981 World Table Tennis Championships and 1983 World Table Tennis Championships, three in the men's team event and one in the mixed doubles at the 1983 World Table Tennis Championships with Ni Xialian.

See also
 List of table tennis players
 List of World Table Tennis Championships medalists

References

Living people
Chinese male table tennis players
Table tennis players from Fujian
People from Xiamen
1956 births
Asian Games medalists in table tennis
Table tennis players at the 1978 Asian Games
Table tennis players at the 1982 Asian Games
Medalists at the 1978 Asian Games
Medalists at the 1982 Asian Games
Asian Games gold medalists for China
Asian Games silver medalists for China
Asian Games bronze medalists for China